Sayed Abu Hossain (babla) (born 12 October 1956) is a Jatiya Party (Ershad) politician and the incumbent Member of Parliament from Dhaka-4.

Early life
Abu Hossain was born on 12 October 1956, to a Bengali Muslim parents Sayed Ikram Hossain and Fatema Khatun. His father was a Syed, claiming descent from Ali, the fourth Caliph of Islam.

Career
Hossain was elected to Parliament from Dhaka-4 in 2014 as a Jatiya Party candidate. The Bangladesh Awami League government withdrew its candidate in Dhaka-4 after reaching an agreement with Jatiya Party. On 10 June 2015, his officer was attacked. Allegedly the attack was carried out by supporters of another Member of Parliament, Sanjida Khanom. Hossain is a Presidium Member of the Jatiya Party.

Controversy
On 11 January 2016, Hossain was accused of assaulting the principal of Dholairparh School and College. He was involved in a dispute over the formation of the managing committee of Dholairparh School and College.

References

1956 births
Living people
Bangladesh Jatiya Party politicians
10th Jatiya Sangsad members
11th Jatiya Sangsad members
3rd Jatiya Sangsad members
4th Jatiya Sangsad members
Bangladeshi people of Arab descent